Bath is an unincorporated community in Aiken County, South Carolina, United States. The community is located in the Horse Creek Valley, and its zip code is 29816. It is part of the Augusta, Georgia metropolitan area.

History
The community's name most likely is a transfer from Bath, England.

In 1925, Bath had 500 inhabitants.

References

Unincorporated communities in Aiken County, South Carolina
Unincorporated communities in South Carolina
Augusta metropolitan area